Turrid, plural turrids, is a common name for a very large group of predatory sea snails, marine gastropod mollusks which until recently were all classified in the family Turridae. However, recently the family was discovered to be polyphyletic and therefore was split into a number of families.

The original family Turridae used to contain more than 4,000 species. the Turridae (sensu Powell 1966)  It was the largest mollusk family and the largest group of marine caenogastropods. There were approximately 27,000 described scientific names (accepted names plus synonyms) within the family Turridae. Turrids constituted more than half of the predatory species of gastropods in some parts of the world (Taylor et al. 1980). However, this very large family was shown to be polyphyletic, and in 2011 it was divided into 13 separate families by Bouchet, Kantor, Sysoev and Puilandre.

The single most complete collection of turrids in museums worldwide is in the Academy of Natural Sciences of Philadelphia malacology collection; this is because of specialized collecting by the American malacologist Virginia Orr Maes (1920-1986).

Distribution 
Turrids are found worldwide in every sea and ocean from both poles to the tropics. They occur from the low-intertidal zone to depths of more than eight thousand metres (e.g., Xanthodaphne levis Sysoev, 1988, collected between 7974–8006 m, in the Bougainville Trench). However, most species of turrids are found in the neritic zone.

Shell description
Most turrids are rather small, with a height under 2 cm, but the adult shells of different species are between 0.3 and 11.4 cm in height.

The shape of the shells is more or less fusiform, varying from very high-spired to broadly ovate. The whorls are elongate to broadly conical.

The sculpture is very variable in form, but most have axial sculpture or spiral sculpture (or a combination of both). Others may be reticulate, beaded, nodulose, or striate.

The aperture of the shell very often has a V-shaped sinus or notch, an indentation on the upper end of the outer lip. This accommodates the anal siphonal notch, commonly known as the "turrid notch".  The siphonal canal is usually open, varying from short and stocky to long and slender. The position of the turrid notch of the shell and the form and sculpture of the whorls have traditionally been the primary methods of classifying the turrids.

The columella is usually smooth and only seldom shows labial plicae. The operculum is horny, but is not always present.

Turrids are carnivorous, predatory gastropods. Most species have a poison gland used with the toxoglossan radula, used to prey on vertebrates and invertebrate animals (mostly polychaete worms)  or in self-defense. Some turrids have lost the radula and the poison gland. The radula, when present, has two or three teeth in a row. It lacks lateral teeth and the marginal teeth are of the wishbone or duplex type. The teeth with a duplex form are not shaped from two distinct elements but grow from a flat plate, by thickening at the edges of the teeth and elevation of the rear edge from the membrane.

Female turrids lay their eggs in lens-shaped capsules.

History of the taxonomy 
The turrids were perceived as one of the most difficult groups to study because of a large number of supra-specific described taxa, which are complicated by their species diversity. Although some species of turrids are relatively common, many are rare, some being known only from single specimens; this is another factor that makes studying the group difficult.

2011 taxonomy
The previous (2005) classification system for the group was thoroughly changed by the publication in 2011 of the article  Bouchet P., Kantor Yu.I., Sysoev A. & Puillandre N. (2011) A new operational classification of the Conoidea. Journal of Molluscan Studies 77: 273-308. The authors presented a new classification of the Conoidea on the genus level, based on anatomical characters but also on the molecular phylogeny as presented by Puillandre N., et al., 2008. The polyphyletic family Turridae was resolved into 13 monophyletic families (containing 358 currently recognized genera and subgenera) :
 Conorbidae
 Borsoniidae
 Clathurellidae
 Mitromorphidae
 Mangeliidae
 Raphitomidae
 Cochlespiridae
 Drilliidae
 Pseudomelatomidae (= Crassispiridae)
 Clavatulidae
 Horaiclavidae
 Turridae s.s.
 Strictispiridae

2005 taxonomy
According to the taxonomy of the Gastropoda by Bouchet & Rocroi, 2005, which attempted to set out a stable taxonomy, this group consisted of the following five subfamilies:
 Turrinae H. Adams & A. Adams, 1853 (1838) - synonyms: Pleurotominae Gray, 1838; Lophiotominae Morrison, 1965 (n.a.)
 Cochlespirinae Powell, 1942
 Crassispirinae McLean, 1971 - synonym: Belinae A. Bellardi, 1875
 Zemaciinae Sysoev, 2003
 Zonulispirinae McLean, 1971

Genera
Genera in the family Turridae used to include:

 Abyssocomitas Sysoev & Kantor, 1986
 Acamptogenotia Rovereto, 1899
 Aforia Dall, 1889
 Anacithara Hedley, 1922
 Ancistrosyrinx Dall, 1881
 Anticomitas Powell, 1942
 Antiguraleus Powell, 1942
 Antimelatoma Powell, 1942
 Antiplanes Dall, 1902
 Aoteadrillia Powell, 1942
 Apiotoma Cossmann, 1889
 Asperdaphne Hedley, 1922
 Austrodrillia Hedley, 1918
 Bathybela Kobelt, 1905
 Belalora Powell, 1951
 Benthoclionella Kilburn, 1974
 Buchema Corea, 1934
 Burchia Bartsch, 1944
 Calcatodrillia Kilburn, 1988
 Carinapex Dall, 1924
 Carinodrillia Dall, 1919
 Carinoturris Bartsch, 1944
 Ceritoturris Dall, 1924
 Cheungbeia Taylor & Wells, 1994
 Clavatula Lamarck, 1801
 Clavosurcula Schepman, 1913
 Clavus Montfort, 1810
 Clionella Gray, 1847
 Cochlespira Conrad, 1865
 Compsodrillia Woodring, 1928
 Conorbela Powell, 1951
 Conticosta Laseron, 1954
 Crassiclava McLean, 1971
 Crassispira Swainson, 1840
 Cretaspira Kuroda & Oyama, 1971
 Cryptogemma Dall, 1918
 Cymakra Gardner, 1937
 Danilacarina Bozzetti, 1997
 Daphnella Hinds, 1844
 Darrylia Garcia, 2008
 Decollidrillia Habe & Ito, 1965
 Doxospira McLean, 1971
 Eosurcula 
 Epideira Hedley, 1918
 Epidirona Iredale, 1931
 Fenimorea Bartsch, 1934
 Fusiturricula Woodring, 1928
 Fusiturris Thiele, 1929
 Gemmula Weinkauff, 1875
 Graciliclava Shuto, 1983
 Haedropleura Monterosato in Bucquoy, Dautzenberg & Dollfus, 1883
 Hauturua Powell, 1942
 Hemilienardia Boettger, 1895
 Heterocithara Hedley, 1922
 Hindsiclava Hertlein and Strong, 1955
 Horaiclavus Oyama, 1954
 Inodrillia Bartsch, 1943
 Inquisitor Hedley, 1918
 Iotyrris Medinskaya & Sysoev, 2001
 Iredalea Oliver, 1915
 Irenosyrinx Dall, 1908
 Iwaoa Kuroda, 1953
 Knefastia Dall, 1919
 Kurilohadalia Sysoev & Kantor, 1986
 Kurodadrillia Azuma, 1975
 Kuroshioturris Shuto, 1961
 Leucosyrinx Dall, 1889  :p
 Lienardia Jousseaume 1884
 Lioglyphostoma Woodring, 1928
 Lophiotoma Casey, 1904
 Lophioturris Powell, 1964
 Liracraea Odhner, 1924
 Lora Gistl, 1848
 Lucerapex Iredale, 1936
 Lusitanops F. Nordsieck, 1968
 Maesiella McLean, 1971
 Makiyamaia Kuroda, 1961
 Marshallena Finlay, 1926
 Mauidrillia Powell, 1942
 Megasurcula Casey, 1904
 Microdrillia Casey, 1903
 Micropleurotoma Thiele, 1929
 Miraclathurella Woodring, 1928
 Monilispira Bartsch & Rehder, 1939
 Naskia Sysoev & Ivanov, 1985
 Neodrillia Bartsch, 1943
 Neoguraleus Powell, 1939
 Neopleurotomoides Shuto, 1925
 Nihonia McNeil, 1961
 Nodotoma Bartsch, 1941
 Nquma Kilburn, 1988
 Oenopota Moerch, 1852
 Paradrillia Makiyama, 1940
 Perrona Schumacher, 1817
 Philbertia Monterosato, 1884
 Phymorhynchus Dall, 1908
 Pilsbryspira Bartsch, 1950
 Pinguigemmula McNeil, 1961
 Plicisyrinx Sysoev & Kantor, 1986
 Polystira Woodring, 1928
 Pseudexomilus Powell, 1944
 Pseudotaranis McLean, 1995
 Psittacodrillia Kilburn, 1988
 Ptychobela Thiele, 1925
 Ptychosyrinx Thiele, 1925
 Pusionella Gray, 1847
 Pyrgospira McLean, 1971
 Rectiplanes Bartsch, 1944
 Rhodopetoma Bartsch, 1944
 Riuguhdrillia Oyama, 1951
 Scaevatula Gofas, 1990
 Shutonia van der Bijl, 1993
 Sinistrella Meyer, 1887
 Spirotropis Sars, 1878
 Splendrillia Dell, 1956
 Steiraxis Dall, 1896
 Stenodrillia Korobkov, 1955
 Striatoguraleus Kilburn, 1994
 Surcula H. Adams & A. Adams, 1853
 Teretia Norman, 1888
 Tomella Swainson, 1840
 Toxiclionella Powell, 1966
 Turricula Schumacher, 1817
 Turridrupa Hedley, 1922
 Turris Röding, 1798 - type genus
 Unedogemmula MacNeil, 1961
 Veprecula Melvill, 1917
 Vexitomina Powell, 1942
 Viridoturris Powell, 1964
 Viridrillia Bartsch, 1943
 Vitricythara Fargo, 1953
 Zemacies Finlay, 1926
 Zonulispira Bartsch, 1950

References

Further reading 
 Kilburn R. N. (1983). "Turridae (Mollusca: Gastropoda) of southern Africa and Mozambique. Part 1. Subfamily Turrinae." Ann. Natal. Mus. 25: 549–585.
 McLean J. (1971). "A revised classification of the family Turridae, with the proposal of new subfamilies, genera, and subgenera from the Eastern Pacific". Veliger 14: 114–130.
 Powell A. W. B. (1964). "The family Turridae in the Indo-Pacific. Part 1, The subfamily Turrinae". Indo-Pacific Mollusca 1: 227–345.
 Tucker J. K. (2004). "Catalog of Recent and fossil turrids (Mollusca: Gastropoda)". Zootaxa 682: 1–1295. preview

External links 

 (older) Turrid Classification

 
Mollusc common names
Polyphyletic groups